The Battle of Khyber Pass (Persian: نبرد تنگه خیبر) was an engagement fought in the mid-eighteenth century between the Afsharid Iran of Nader Shah and the Mughal vassal state of Peshawar. The result of the battle was an overwhelming victory for the Persians, opening up the path ahead to invade the crown-lands of the Mughal Empire of Muhammad Shah.

Background 

The first major military event of Nader's reign as Shah of Persia was the conquest of Qandahar. Already, Nader was in the process of concocting a pretext for an invasion of Mughal India. Succeeding in capturing Qandahar and putting an end to Hotaki Afghan rule, he seized on the excuse that the Mughal authorities had been deliberately non-cooperative in handing over spies and fugitives from the Afghan army.

Reza Qoli, Nader's son, was appointed as viceroy and sent to Khorasan giving time for Nader to move his army east, a day after, towards Jalalabad where he made an encampment. At this point in time, intelligence reports came in that the governors of Kabul & Peshawar had raised an army of some 20,000, mostly Afghan warriors, and despite receiving no aid from Delhi, they were intent on resisting Nader's incursion upon their lands.

Battle 

The position that had been chosen by the Afghans to resist the Persian army could scarcely have been better selected, as through the narrow pass of Khyber, only a small column of men could hope to march and any deployment into fighting formations would be an impossibility. Nader being convinced of the futility of a head-on struggle, instead opted for a more refined approach. A local guide informed him of a difficult yet traversable pass running parallel to that of Khyber called the pass of Chatchoobi.

Setting out on November 26 from near Jalalabad, the Persian army arrived at Barikab (33 kilometres from the Khyber Pass) where Nader divided his army leaving his son Nasrollah Mirza behind with the bulk of the forces at his disposal and sending forth 12,000 men to the Khyber Pass under Nasrollah Qoli whilst he gathered a 10,000 light cavalry under his direct command. Beginning an epic flank-march of over 80 kilometres through some of the most unnavigable terrain in Asia, Nader reached close to Ali-Masjed where the 10,000 troops of his army curved their route of march northwards and onto the eastern end of the Khyber Pass.

The Persian cavalry formed ranks and swept into a deadly charge against the startled Afghan forces who despite being twice their number, and resisting the initial shock of finding the Persians behind their positions, managed to somehow put up a valiant last stand before they were all either killed, taken prisoner or fled the field of battle leaving the governor of Peshawar to be made captive. The Russian general Kishmishev wrote of the campaign as a "masterpiece" of warfare.

Aftermath 

Soon after, both Peshawar and Attock fell to Persian subjugation and Nader Shah marched against Lahore. The Mughal army, which the governor of Lahore had arrayed against the onslaught of the invaders, was routed when Nader pounced upon it from an unexpected direction forcing the remainder to withdraw to the city walls and shortly afterwards surrender as well as pay a heavy tribute in gold.

The news of these catastrophes engulfed the Mughal authorities in Delhi in horror as they sent frantic requests of troops and levies throughout northern India.

See also
Battle of Karnal
Nadir Shah's invasion of India
Mughal Empire

Notes

References

Sources

Khyber pass
Karnal 1739
Karnal 1739
1739 in India
History of Peshawar
Campaigns of Nader Shah